The Half Sisters is a Philippine television drama romance series broadcast by GMA Network. Directed by Mark A. Reyes, it stars Barbie Forteza and Thea Tolentino in the title roles. It premiered on June 9, 2014, replacing Villa Quintana on the network's Afternoon Prime line up. The series concluded on January 15, 2016, with a total of 418 episodes. It was replaced by Wish I May in its timeslot.

The series is streaming online on YouTube.

Cast and characters

Lead cast
 Barbie Forteza as Diana M. Valdicanas 
 Thea Tolentino as Ashley "Ash" M. Alcantara

Supporting cast
 Jean Garcia as Karina "Rina" Mercado-Alcantara /  Alexa Robbins
 Jomari Yllana as Benjamin "Benjie" Valdicañas / Noli delos Santos / Tonyo
 Ryan Eigenmann as Alfred Alcantara / Damon Sarmiento
 Andre Paras as Bradley Castillo
 Derrick Monasterio as Sebastian "Baste" Castillo-Torres
 Mel Martinez as Venus Mercado

Guest cast
 Carmen Soriano as Lupita Valdicañas
 Pinky Marquez as Cleo Castillo
 JC Tiuseco as Carl Domingo
 Carlo Gonzales as Paulo Zulueta
 Cherie Gil as Magnolia McBride
 Ruru Madrid as Joaquin Castillo
 Vaness del Moral as Jackie Perez-Alcantara / Estrella Liwanag
 Pancho Magno as Juancho Rodriguez
 Jak Roberto as Ambo
 Sanya Lopez as Lorna
 Buboy Villar as Marlon
 Gloria Romero as Elizabeth McBride
 Eddie Garcia as Eduardo Guevarra-McBride
 Gwen Zamora as Abigail McBride
 Aljur Abrenica as Malcolm Angeles
 Edwin Reyes as Rafael Castillo
 Benjie Paras as Peter
 Gardo Versoza as Santi Abbarientos
 Elle Ramirez as Ericka Abbarientos
 Eula Valdez as Ysabel Zuñiga-Valdicañas
 Shyr Valdez as Cynthia 
 Chanda Romero as Cielo
 Luz Valdez as Magda
 Juancho Trivino as Charles
 Winwyn Marquez as Vanessa Rodriguez
 Aifha Medina as Tanya
 Archie Adamos as Ruben

Production
During a press visit to the series' set located in Commonwealth, Quezon City, the show was extended until January 15, 2016. He also shared that the show's final chapter will now focus on an edgier plot and might not have another special guest since they want to focus on their lead stars.

Ratings
According to AGB Nielsen Philippines' Mega Manila household television ratings, the pilot episode of The Half Sisters earned an 11.5% rating. While the final episode scored a 23.2% rating. The series had its highest rating on November 28, 2014, with a 25.6% rating.

Accolades

References

External links
 
 

2014 Philippine television series debuts
2016 Philippine television series endings
Filipino-language television shows
GMA Network drama series
Television series about teenagers
Television shows set in the Philippines
Television shows set in Tokyo